The 2018 Karshi Challenger was a professional tennis tournament played on hard courts. It was the twelfth edition of the tournament which was part of the 2018 ATP Challenger Tour. It took place in Qarshi, Uzbekistan between 7 and 12 May 2018.

Singles main-draw entrants

Seeds

 1 Rankings as of 30 April 2018.

Other entrants
The following players received wildcards into the singles main draw:
  Farrukh Dustov
  Sergey Fomin
  Jurabek Karimov
  Khumoyun Sultanov

The following players received entry from the qualifying draw:
  Sergey Betov
  Tristan Lamasine
  Sasikumar Mukund
  Shuichi Sekiguchi

Champions

Singles

   Egor Gerasimov def.  Sergey Betov 7–6(7–3), 2–0 ret.

Doubles

  Timur Khabibulin /  Vladyslav Manafov def.  Sanjar Fayziev /  Jurabek Karimov 6–2, 6–1.

References

2018 ATP Challenger Tour
2018